Yingde (postal: Yingtak) is a historical city in the north of Guangdong Province, China. The city is on the Bei River, a tributary of the Pearl River. Administratively, it is part of the Qingyuan prefecture-level city.

The principal varieties of Chinese spoken are Cantonese and Hakka. Mandarin is rarely spoken except in teaching.

It is famous for its Yingde Stone and Yingdehong tea.  In 1963 the British royal family popularized Yingde's black tea worldwide after offering the tea to guests at the Queen's Banquet. Yingde's tea history dates back to over 1,200 years ago.  It is considered to be one of the top three places in the world to grow black tea.

Climate

See also

References

 
County-level cities in Guangdong
Qingyuan